The National Emblem of the Lao People's Democratic Republic shows the national shrine Pha That Luang. A dam is pictured, which is a symbol of power generation at the reservoir Nam Ngum. An asphalt street is also pictured, as well as a stylized watered field. 

In the lower part is a section of a gear wheel.  The inscription on the left reads "Peace, Independence, Democracy" (Lao script: ສັນຕິພາບ ເອກະລາດ ປະຊາທິປະໄຕ) and on the right, "Unity and Prosperity" (Lao script: ເອກະພາບ ວັດຖະນາຖາວອນ.)

History 
The coat of arms was changed in August 1991 in relation to the fall of the Soviet Union. The Communist red star and hammer and sickle were replaced with the national shrine at Pha That Luang. The coat of arms is specified in the Laotian constitution:

Gallery

References

National symbols of Laos
Laos
Laos
Laos
Laos
Laos
Laos